Mike Wofford (born in San Antonio, Texas) is a jazz pianist who was raised in San Diego, California. He was an accompanist to singers Sarah Vaughan (in 1979) and Ella Fitzgerald (1989–1994).

He was known in the jazz community going back to the 1960s for the albums Strawberry Wine and Summer Night. He performed with Shorty Rogers, Bud Shank, Joe Pass, Shelly Manne, Kenny Burrell, and Zoot Sims.

Discography

As leader
 Strawberry Wine with John Doling, John Guerin (Epic, 1966)
 Summer Night with Monty Budwig, John Guerin (Milestone, 1968)
 Scott Joplin: Interpretations '76 with Chuck Domanico, Shelly Manne (Flying Dutchman, 1976)
 Afterthoughts (Discovery, 1978)
 Mike Wofford Trio Plays Jerome Kern with Jim Plank, Andy Simpkins (Discovery, 1980) 
 Mike Wofford Quartet Plays Jerome Kern Vol. 2 with Jim Plank, Andy Simpkins (Discovery, 1980) 
 Plays Jerome Kern Vol. 3 with Jim Plank, Andy Simpkins (Discovery, 1981) 
 Sure Thing with Jim Plank, Andy Simpkins, Tom Azarello, Monty Budwig, John Guerin (Discovery, 1981) 
 Funkallero with Sherman Ferguson, Andy Simpkins, Paul Sundford (Trend, 1987) 
 Plays Gerald Wilson: Gerald's People with Richie Gajate Garcia, Rufus Reid (Musicraft, 1989)
 Mike Wofford at Maybeck (Concord Jazz, 1991)
 Synergy with Joe LaBarbera, Rob Thorsen (Heavywood, 1998) 	
 Time Cafe with Duncan Moore, Darek Oleszkiewicz (Azica, 2001)  
 Turn Signal with Holly Hofmann (Capri, 2012)
 It's Personal (Capri, 2013)

As sideman
With Elek Bacsik
 Bird and Dizzy – a Musical Tribute (Flying Dutchman, 1975)

With Kenny Burrell
 Both Feet on the Ground (Fantasy, 1973)

With Gil Fuller
 Night Flight (Pacific Jazz, 1965)
With Richard "Groove" Holmes
 Six Million Dollar Man,  (RCA/Flying Dutchman, 1975)
With John Klemmer
 Constant Throb (Impulse!, 1971)

With Shelly Manne 
 Jazz Gunn (Atlantic, 1967)
 Perk Up (Concord Jazz, 1967 [1976])
 Daktari (Atlantic, 1967)
 Alive in London (Contemporary, 1970)
 Mannekind (Mainstream, 1972)
 Essence (Galaxy, 1977)
 French Concert (Galaxy, 1977 [1979]) with Lee Konitz

With Oliver Nelson
 Skull Session (Flying Dutchman, 1975)
 Stolen Moments (East Wind, 1975)

With Howard Roberts
 Antelope Freeway (Impulse!, 1971)
 Equinox Express Elevator (Impulse!, 1972)

With Sonny Stitt
 Dumpy Mama (Flying Dutchman, 1975)

With Gerald Wilson
 California Soul (Pacific Jazz, 1968)
 Lomelin (Discovery, 1981)

With Kenny Rankin
 Professional Dreamer (Private Music, 1995)

References

External links
 Official site
 Mike Wofford Interview NAMM Oral History Library (2010)

American jazz pianists
American male pianists
1938 births
Living people
Musicians from San Antonio
Milestone Records artists
20th-century American pianists
Jazz musicians from Texas
21st-century American pianists
20th-century American male musicians
21st-century American male musicians
American male jazz musicians